Ulugbek Qodirov (sometimes spelled Ulugbek Kadirov in English),   (born August 3, 1983) is an Uzbek Actor.

Life 
Ulugʻbek Nosirovich Qodirov was born on August 3, 1983, in Tashkent, the capital of Uzbekistan. He graduated from school number 34 in Tashkent. He also graduated from the Art Institute of Uzbekistan. In 2005, he received the "Best Young Actor of the Year" award in Uzbekistan. Ulugʻbek Qodirov  gained wide recognition and fame in Uzbekistan in 2009 after starring in the Uzbek drama film "Shabbona".

Today, the actor lives and works in the USA. One of the films that brought the actor the most popularity was the 2016 film Baron. This film was recognized as the film that opened new pages in Uzbek cinema. In addition, the film "Traitor", dedicated to the events in Andijan in 2005, brought a great reputation to the actor.

Family 
 Father: Nasir Kadirov
 Mother: Farida Kadirova
 Brother: Islombek Kadirov Nasirovich
 Sister: Feruza Kadirova Nasirovna
 Sister: Aziza Kadirova Nasirovna
 Sister: Dilfuza Kadirova Nasirovna
 Wife: Azizaxon Kadirova

Children 
 Imona Kadirova Ulugbekovna April 1, 2014.
 Amirbek Kadirov Ulugbekovich  July 21, 2016.
 Zubayda Kadirova Ulugbekovna September 13, 2021

Filmography 
Below is a chronologically ordered list of films in which Ulugbek Qodirov has appeared.

Music videos

Awards 
 In 2005 he received the "Best Young Actor of the Year" award in Uzbekistan.
 In 2008 he became the winner of M&TVA.

References

External links 
 

 Ulugbek Kadirov Instagram

  Buluteka

1983 births
Living people
Uzbeks
Uzbekistani male film actors
21st-century Uzbekistani male singers
21st-century Uzbekistani male actors